Ceregnano is a comune (municipality) in the Province of Rovigo in the Italian region Veneto, located about  southwest of Venice and about  southeast of Rovigo.

Ceregnano borders the following municipalities: Adria, Crespino, Gavello, Rovigo, Villadose.

Demographic evolution

Twin towns
 Seeheim-Jugenheim, Germany, since 2008

References

Cities and towns in Veneto